Guelfo is a masculine given name. It may refer to:

 Leonardo da Pistoia (1502–c. 1548), Italian painter also known as Guelfo dal Celano in Naples
 Guelfo Cavanna (1850–1920), Italian entomologist
 Guelfo Zamboni (1897–1994), Italian diplomat who saved hundreds of Jews from the Holocaust

Masculine given names